William Gillingham may refer to:

William Gillingham I, MP for Rochester (UK Parliament constituency) in 1388
William Gillingham II, MP for Rochester (UK Parliament constituency) in 1391
William Gillingham (footballer), footballer born in 1998